Sasa tsuboiana   is a species of flowering plant in the family Poaceae found in Japan.

References

External links

Bambusoideae
Endemic flora of Japan
Grasses of Asia
Plants described in 1912